Taphow   was a Native American Munsee sachem in Connecticut, was the son of Ponus and the uncle to Katonah. Taphow, known as the "Sakimore and Commander in Chief of all those Indians inhabiting in northern New Jersey, signed many land deeds "in the lands of Taphow and his relations" including the Ramapo Tract in 1700, the Kakiat Patent in 1701 and witnessed the sale of the Wawayanda Patent. Taphow's wife, Awowas (Wawowus), and son Quatowquechuck also signed on some land deeds. Taphow was accused of murder in Connecticut but was acquitted for lack of evidence.

Notes

References

Bibliography

External links 
Official Tribal Website of the Ramapough
Ramapough Mountain Indians: People, Places and Cultural Traditions Edward J. Lenik

Native American leaders
People from New York (state)
18th-century Native Americans
Lenape people